The individual championship test, grade III, para-equestrian dressage event at the 2016 Summer Paralympics was contested on 11 September at Olympic Equestrian Centre in Rio.

The competition was assessed by a ground jury composed of five judges placed at locations designated E, H, C, M, and B. Each judge rated the competitors' performances with a percentage score. The five scores from the jury were then averaged to determine a rider's total percentage score.

Results

References

Individual championship test grade